"Arcadia" is a song by American singer-songwriter Lana Del Rey. It was released on September 8, 2021, by Interscope Records and Polydor Records as the second and final single from Del Rey's eighth studio album, Blue Banisters (2021). The song was written and produced by the singer alongside Drew Erickson.

Critical reception 
The song received critical acclaim from critics. In an article for the Los Angeles Times, Christi Carras described the song as a "languid new ballad" and music video as "love letters to Arcadia and Los Angeles". Writing for Spin, Sarah Grant called the single "elegant and elegiac", with Del Rey's vocals "liberated, clear-eyed, and mournful" as she "sings her origin story with an innocence". Grant further praised the track as an "astonishing farewell to an industry that trashed [Del Rey] from the beginning". Reanna Cruz from NPR acclaimed Del Rey's vocals as her "most mature tone yet" and wrote that the lyrics "carefully construct the very landscapes she describes", "[connecting] fully with her desired ethos". Writing for Consequence, Eddie Fu praised the song's "piano-driven production", calling it a "seductive track".

Music video
The music video for "Arcadia" was released on YouTube alongside the song on September 8, 2021. It was directed by Del Rey, although the singer stated on Twitter that it was "directed by nobody". An alternate video was released on October 7, 2021.

Live performances
On October 22, 2021, Del Rey appeared on the American late-night talk show, The Late Show with Stephen Colbert, and performed "Arcadia".

Personnel 
Credits adapted from Tidal.

 Lana Del Rey — writer, vocals, producer, wind and string arrangements
 Drew Erickson — writer, producer, piano, synthesizer, organ, wind and string arrangements, mixing
 Jacob Brown — cello
 Wayne Bergeron — trumpet
 Dan Fornero — trumpet
 Dan Rosenbom — trumpet
 Andrew Bulbrook — violin
 Wynton Grant — violin
 Blake Cooper — tuba
 Zac Dellinger — viola
 Dean Reed — engineering, mixing
 Michael Harris — engineering, mixing
 Ben Fletcher — engineering assistant
 John Scher — engineering assistant
 Adam Ayan — mastering

Charts

Release history

References

2020s ballads
2021 songs
2021 singles
American folk songs
Folk ballads
Lana Del Rey songs
Interscope Records singles
Polydor Records singles
Songs about California
Songs written by Lana Del Rey
Song recordings produced by Lana Del Rey